1957 Egypt Cup Final, was the final match of the 1956–57 Egypt Cup, was between Zamalek and Al-Masry, Zamalek won the match 3–0.

Route to the final

Match details

References

External links

1957
EC 1957
EC 1957